catholic is the fourth solo album from Gavin Friday, written and recorded with musician Herbie Macken and released in 2011. It was released in Ireland on Good Friday (22 April), 16 years after the release of his previous album, Shag Tobacco. catholic deals with concepts of letting go and coming to terms with loss. It was produced by Ken Thomas (Throbbing Gristle, Cocteau Twins, Sigur Rós) and recorded in Dublin, Cork and West Yorkshire. Patrick McCabe wrote the novella Requiem for the Dying for the album liner notes. The video for "Able" was directed by Kevin Godley.

Track listing
 "Able" – 4:47
 "Land on the Moon" – 5:07
 "A Song that Hurts" – 5:33
 "The Only One" – 4:16
 "Blame" – 4:54
 "The Sun and the Moon and the Stars" – 4:17
 "It's All Ahead of You" – 4:34
 "Perfume" – 3:34
 "Epilogue" – 3:09
 "Where'd Ya Go? Gone" – 4:41
 "Lord I'm Comin'" – 6:52

Personnel
Gavin Friday – vocals, backing vocals
Herbie Macken – keyboards, piano, guitars, backing vocals, piano, programming
Kate Ellis – cello
Andre Antunes – drums, percussion
Gareth Hughes – bass guitars
Anthony Drennan – electric guitar
Jolyon Vaughan Thomas – programming, electric guitars, bass, keyboards
Matthew Allsop – euphonium
Moya Brennan – backing vocals
Amy Odell – vocals, backing vocals
John Kelly – harmonica

Album title
The album's title is deliberately spelled with a lower case c to emphasise the word's original meaning: universal, for every man, with wide sympathies. Friday stated he wanted to claim back the word from the Roman Catholic church.

Album cover
The album's cover photo is based on and pays homage to the painting Michael Collins, Love of Ireland by Sir John Lavery which depicts Irish revolutionary leader Michael Collins lying in state. Friday had seen the painting at the Sir John Lavery "Passion and Politics" exhibit in Dublin at the Hugh Lane Gallery in September 2010. The photo was taken by Perry Ogden. Although the image sets up parallels between the turmoil of the birth years of an independent Ireland and the mid-2000s state of upheaval and political chaos, Friday has stated that this is "an emotional, not a political, album".

References

2011 albums
Gavin Friday albums
Albums produced by Ken Thomas (record producer)
Rubyworks Records albums